This is a list of the busiest railway stations in Great Britain on the National Rail network for the 1 April 2021 to 31 March 2022 financial year. The dataset records patterns of mobility during the second year of the COVID-19 pandemic in the United Kingdom, with significantly reduced levels of mobility compared with the 2019–20 data. Extended periods of significantly reduced commuting and long distance travel caused many major stations to drop in the ranking. During 2021–22 there were 990million passenger journeys on the network, compared to 388million in 2020–21 and 1,739 million in 2019–20. With pandemic restrictions eliminated during the year, passenger levels during 2021–22 were more than double those of the previous year. The busiest station was London Waterloo, replacing Stratford Regional which was top of the ranking the previous year.

Methodology
The figures are collected by the Office of Rail and Road, and are estimates based on ticket usage data use of an Origin Destination Matrix, a comprehensive matrix of rail flows between stations throughout Great Britain in the financial year of 2021–22. The data count entries and exits at any station. Note that the data covers mainland Great Britain and surrounding small islands (such as the Isle of Wight), not the United Kingdom, and so exclude tickets within Northern Ireland and Eurostar. There are various further limits to the data due to the variety of ticketing options available on rail services within the UK; these are outlined in full in the report on the data. Only tickets sold for National Rail services are included; some stations may also be served by underground metro or urban light rail networks. Stations serving solely the London Underground, light rail, special tours or heritage railways are therefore excluded. Data for 2021–22 was published on 24 November 2022.

All stations
There were 24 stations with more than 10million entries and exits, compared to five stations the previous year and 43 in 2019–20.

See also
List of busiest railway stations in Great Britain (2020–21)
List of busiest railway stations in Great Britain (2019–20)
List of busiest London Underground stations
List of busiest railway stations in Europe
List of busiest railway stations in North America
List of busiest railway stations in West Yorkshire

Notes

References

External links
Station usage - Main page

 
Busiest railway stations in Great Britain